Ángel M. Rodríguez Otero is a Puerto Rican politician from the Popular Democratic Party (PPD). Rodríguez was elected to the Senate of Puerto Rico in 2012.

Rodríguez was born in Comerío to a family of 10 children, including himself. He has a Master's degree in Public Administration from the University of Puerto Rico.

Rodríguez decided to run for a seat in the Senate of Puerto Rico under the Popular Democratic Party (PPD). After winning a spot on the 2012 primaries, he was elected on the general elections to represent the District of Guayama.

See also
25th Senate of Puerto Rico

References
 Angel M. Rodríguez Profile on El Nuevo Día

Living people
Members of the Senate of Puerto Rico
People from Comerío, Puerto Rico
University of Puerto Rico alumni
1967 births